This article contains a list of current SNCF railway stations in the Grand Est region of France.

Ardennes (08)

 Amagne-Lucquy
 Anchamps
 Aubrives
 Bogny-sur-Meuse
 Carignan
 Charleville-Mézières
 Deville
 Donchery
 Fépin
 Fumay
 Givet
 Haybes
 Joigny-sur-Meuse
 Laifour
 Liart
 Lumes
 Mohon
 Monthermé
 Nouvion-sur-Meuse
 Nouzonville
 Poix-Terron
 Rethel
 Revin
 Sedan
 Vireux-Molhain
 Vrigne-Meuse

Aube (10)

 Bar-sur-Aube
 Nogent-sur-Seine
 Romilly-sur-Seine
 Troyes
 Vendeuvre-sur-Barse

Bas-Rhin (67)

 Barr
 Benfeld
 Bischheim
 Bischoffsheim
 Bischwiller
 Bourg-Bruche
 Brumath
 Dachstein
 Dambach-la-Ville
 Dettwiller
 Diemeringen
 Dorlisheim
 Drusenheim
 Duppigheim
 Duttlenheim
 Ebersheim
 Eichhoffen
 Entzheim-Aéroport
 Epfig
 Erstein
 Fegersheim
 Fouday
 Gambsheim
 Geispolsheim
 Gertwiller
 Goxwiller
 Graffenstaden
 Gresswiller
 Gundershoffen
 Haguenau
 Heiligenberg-Mollkirch
 Herrlisheim
 Hochfelden
 Hoelschloch
 Hœnheim
 Hœrdt
 Hoffen
 Hunspach
 Ingwiller
 Kilstett
 Kogenheim
 Krimmeri-Meinau
 Kurtzenhouse
 Lauterbourg
 Limersheim
 Lingolsheim
 Lutzelhouse
 Marienthal
 Matzenheim
 Mertzwiller
 Molsheim
 Mommenheim
 Mothern
 Mullerhof
 Munchhausen
 Mundolsheim
 Mutzig
 Niederbronn-les-Bains
 Obermodern
 Obernai
 Oermingen
 Reichshoffen-Ville
 Riedseltz
 Rœschwoog
 Roppenheim
 Rosheim
 Rothau
 Rountzenheim
 Russ-Hersbach
 Saales
 Saint-Blaise-la-Roche-Poutay
 Saulxures
 Saverne
 Scherwiller
 Schirmeck-La Broque
 Schweighouse-sur-Moder
 Schwindratzheim
 Sélestat
 Seltz
 Sessenheim
 Soultz-sous-Forets
 Steinbourg
 Stephansfeld
 Strasbourg-Roethig
 Strasbourg-Ville
 Tieffenbach-Struth
 Urmatt
 Vendenheim
 Walbourg
 La Wantzenau
 Weyersheim
 Wilwisheim
 Wingen-sur-Moder
 Wisches
 Wissembourg

Haute-Marne (52)

 Bayard
 Bologne
 Chaumont
 Chevillon
 Culmont-Chalindrey
 Donjeux
 Eurville
 Froncles
 Fronville-Saint-Urbain
 Gudmont
 Joinville
 Langres
 Saint-Dizier
 Vignory
 Vraincourt-Viéville

Haut-Rhin (68)

 Altkirch
 Bantzenheim
 Bartenheim
 Bitschwiller
 Bollwiller
 Breitenbach
 Cernay (Haut-Rhin)
 Colmar
 Colmar-Mésanges
 Colmar-Saint-Joseph
 Dannemarie
 Fellering
 Flaxlanden
 Graffenwald
 Gunsbach-Griesbach
 Habsheim
 Herrlisheim-près-Colmar
 Illfurth
 Ingersheim Cité Scolaire
 Kruth
 Logelbach
 Luttenbach-près-Munster
 Lutterbach
 Merxheim
 Metzeral
 Montreux-Vieux
 Moosch
 Muhlbach-sur-Munster
 Mulhouse-Dornach
 Mulhouse-Ville
 Munster
 Munster-Badischhof
 Oderen
 Raedersheim
 Ranspach
 Richwiller
 Rixheim
 Rouffach
 Saint-Amarin
 Saint-Gilles
 Saint-Louis
 Saint-Louis-la-Chaussée
 Sierentz
 Staffelfelden
 Thann
 Thann-Centre
 Thann-Saint-Jacques
 Turckheim
 Vieux-Thann
 Vieux-Thann-ZI
 Walbach
 Walheim
 Wesserling
 Wihr-au-Val-Soultzbach
 Willer sur Thur
 Zillisheim

Marne (51)

 Avenay
 Ay
 Bazancourt
 Bouy
 Breuil-Romain
 Châlons-en-Champagne
 Champagne-Ardenne TGV
 Courcy-Brimont
 Dormans
 Épernay
 Fismes
 Franchet d'Esperey
 Germaine
 Jonchery-sur-Vesle
 Loivre
 Magneux-Courlandon
 Montbré
 Mourmelon-le-Petit
 Muizon
 Prunay
 Reims
 Reims-Maison-Blanche
 Rilly-la-Montagne
 Saint-Hilaire-au-Temple
 Sainte-Menehould
 Sept-Saulx
 Sillery
 Trois-Puits
 Val-de-Vesle
 Vitry-le-François

Meurthe-et-Moselle (54)

 Auboué
 Audun-le-Roman
 Azerailles
 Baccarat
 Bayon
 Belleville
 Bertrichamps
 Blainville-Damelevières
 Champigneulles
 Chenevières
 Conflans-Jarny
 Dieulouard
 Dombasle-sur-Meurthe
 Einvaux
 Fontenoy-sur-Moselle
 Foug
 Frouard
 Hatrize
 Homécourt
 Houdemont
 Igney-Avricourt
 Jarville-la-Malgrange
 Jœuf
 Laneuveville-devant-Nancy
 Liverdun
 Longuyon
 Longwy
 Ludres
 Lunéville
 Marbache
 Ménil-Flin
 Messein
 Mont-sur-Meurthe
 Nancy-Ville
 Neuves-Maisons
 Onville
 Pagny-sur-Moselle
 Pompey
 Pont-à-Mousson
 Pont-Saint-Vincent
 Rosières-aux-Salines
 Saint-Clément-Laronxe
 Thiaville
 Toul
 Valleroy-Moineville
 Vandières
 Varangéville-Saint-Nicolas

Meuse (55)

 Bar-le-Duc
 Baroncourt
 Clemont-en-Argonne
 Commercy
 Étain
 Les Islettes
 Meuse TGV
 Montmédy
 Nançois-Tronville
 Pagny-sur-Meuse
 Revigny
 Verdun

Moselle (57)

 Ancy-sur-Moselle
 Anzeling
 Apach
 Ars-sur-Moselle
 Audun-le-Tiche
 Basse-Ham
 Bénestroff
 Béning
 Berthelming
 Bouzonville
 Courcelles-sur-Nied
 Distroff
 Ébersviller
 Farébersviller
 Farschviller
 Faulquemont
 Forbach
 Freistroff
 Gandrange-Amnéville
 Hagondange
 Hayange
 Herny
 Hettange-Grande
 Hombourg-Budange
 Hombourg-Haut
 Hundling
 Kalhausen
 Kédange
 Kœnigsmacker
 Kuntzig
 Lorraine TGV
 Lutzelbourg
 Maizières-lès-Metz
 Metzervisse
 Metz-Nord
 Metz-Ville
 Morhange
 Moyeuvre-Grande
 Novéant
 Peltre
 Réding
 Rémilly
 Richemont
 Rombas-Clouange
 Saint-Avold
 Sanry-sur-Nied
 Sarrebourg
 Sarreguemines
 Sierck-les-Bains
 Téting
 Thionville
 Uckange
 Volmerange-les-Mines
 Walygator-Parc
 Wittring
 Woippy
 Yutz

Vosges (88)

 Arches
 Bains-les-Bains
 Bruyères
 Charmes (Vosges)
 Châtel-Nomexy
 Contrexéville
 Éloyes
 Épinal
 Étival-Clairefontaine
 Igney
 Neufchâteau
 Pouxeux
 Provenchères-sur-Fave
 Raon-l'Étape
 Remiremont
 Saint-Dié-des-Vosges
 Saint-Michel-sur-Meurthe
 Saint-Nabord
 Thaon
 Vincey
 Vittel
 Xertigny

See also
 SNCF 
 List of SNCF stations for SNCF stations in other regions

Grand Est